Schopfheim station is a railway station in the municipality of Schopfheim, in Baden-Württemberg, Germany. It is located on standard gauge Wiese Valley Railway of Deutsche Bahn. Passenger service over that line ended in 1971, and the line itself was abandoned in 1994.

Services
 the following services stop at Schopfheim:

 Basel S-Bahn:

References

External links
 
 

Railway stations in Baden-Württemberg
Buildings and structures in Lörrach (district)